Charopinesta suavis, also known as the sweet pinhead snail, is a species of land snail that is endemic to Australia's Lord Howe Island in the Tasman Sea.

Description
The depressedly turbinate shell of the mature snail is 1.4 mm in height, with a diameter of 2.6 mm, and a low, stepped spire. It is golden amber in colour. The whorls are slightly rounded, with impressed sutures and fine, very closely spaced radial ribs. It has a roundedly lunate aperture and moderately widely open umbilicus.

Distribution and habitat
This extremely rare snail is only been recorded by a single shell collected from the summit of Mount Lidgbird and may be extinct.

References

 
 

 
suavis
Gastropods of Lord Howe Island
Taxa named by Tom Iredale
Gastropods described in 1944
Species known from a single specimen